Rufous is a color that may be described as reddish-brown or brownish-red, as of rust or oxidised iron. The first recorded use of rufous as a color name in English was in 1782. However, the color is also recorded earlier in 1527 as a diagnostic urine color.

The word "rufous" is derived from the Latin rufus, meaning "red", and is used as an adjective in the names of many animals—especially birds—to describe the color of their skin, fur, or plumage.

See also

List of colours: N–Z
Lists of colours

References

Bird colours
Shades of brown
Shades of red